The Zicklin School of Business (commonly known as Zicklin) is the business school of Baruch College. It was established in 1919 and is named after financier and alumnus Lawrence Zicklin. Zicklin is the largest business school in the United States, with more than 10,000 students enrolled in its programs. The current dean is H. Fenwick Huss, formerly the dean of the J. Mack Robinson College of Business at Georgia State University. Zicklin and the Murray Koppelman School of Business at Brooklyn College are the only two units of the City University of New York that are accredited by the Association to Advance Collegiate Schools of Business (AACSB).

History
In 1919, the City College of New York established a School of Business and Civic Administration, offering its first MBA program one year later. The school was renamed in 1953 in honor of Bernard M. Baruch, a noted statesman and financier who was instrumental in the school's formation. In 1968, after the addition of arts and sciences departments and degree programs, Baruch College became a senior college within the CUNY system.

In 1998, Baruch College's business school was renamed the Zicklin School of Business, in recognition of an $18 million donation by Lawrence and Carol Zicklin. Later, Zicklin made an additional $2 million donation to endow Baruch College’s Center for Financial Integrity. Lawrence Zicklin was a former Chairman of the Board of investment management firm Neuberger Berman.

Academics
Zicklin offers the following degree programs: BBA, MBA, Executive MBA, MS in Finance, MS in Business Analytics, MS in Information Systems, MBA in Health Care Administration, and MS in Industrial and Labor Relations.

Joint degrees are available with other institutions, such as a JD/MBA (with Brooklyn Law School or New York Law School, and a PhD in Business (with the CUNY Graduate Center).

Undergraduate programs
The BBA program offers majors in Accountancy, Computer Information Systems, Economics, Finance, Industrial/Organizational Psychology, International Business, Management, Marketing Management, Real Estate, and Statistics and Quantitative Modeling.

Centers and institutes
Zicklin also has a number of specialized or cross-disciplinary centers and institutes, including: 
Lawrence N. Field Center for Entrepreneurship, which draws together faculty, students, advisors, alumni and volunteers to support start-ups and established businesses and the college’s constituents.
Steven L. Newman Real Estate Institute, which provides applied research, continuing education and conferences to the real estate industry.
Wasserman Trading Floor/Subotnick Financial Services Center, which includes a functional trading floor with 55 professional workstations, providing experiential learning opportunities.
Weissman Center for International Business, which supports international opportunities for students, including international internships, study abroad programs, and seminars with international executives. 
Robert Zicklin Center for Corporate Integrity, which provides a forum for discussion of issues related to business ethics, including: transparency of corporate reporting, corporate governance, legal and ethical corporate behavior, executive accountability, corporate responsibility in global business development, risk assessment and amelioration, conflicting corporate stakeholder interests, and the role of governmental regulation.

Rankings

U.S. News & World Report, in its 2022 ranking of "Best Business Schools," listed Zicklin as #77 nationally, making it the #1 public business school in New York.
In 2015, Forbes ranked MBA programs for "best return on investment," and Zicklin ranked #55 nationally.
The Princeton Review and Entrepreneur magazine ranked Zicklin #5 in 2018 among colleges nationally for its undergraduate entrepreneurship program, and #10 for the graduate school program.
Crain's New York Business included Zicklin in 2014 on its list of "top 25 MBA programs in the New York Area."

Notable alumni

 William F. Aldinger III ('69), businessman
 Abraham Beame ('28), 104th Mayor of New York City
 Mark Bloch, artist, archivist and writer 
 Anthony Chan ('79), chief economist, JPMorgan Chase Bank, N.A.
 Akis Cleanthous (BBA '88), former chairman of the Cyprus Stock Exchange
 Sam Eshaghoff, real estate developer
 Sidney Harman ('39), founder of Harman International Industries
 Carl Heastie (MBA '07), 120th Speaker of the New York State Assembly
 Robert Holland, businessman
 G. Winston James, writer and activist
 Mayuri Kango (MBA '07), actress
 James Lam ('83), author
 Ralph Lauren (dropped out), fashion designer
 Adam Neumann (BBA '17), co-founder of WeWork
 Oscar N. Onyema (MBA '98), CEO of the Nigerian Stock Exchange
 Martin Shkreli ('04), founder of Turing Pharmaceuticals 
 Elissa Shevinsky, businesswoman
 Carl Spielvogel (BBA '57), former U.S. Ambassador to Slovakia
 Stuart Subotnick (BBA '62), CEO of Metromedia
 Carolyn Walker-Diallo, lawyer
 George Weissman (BBA '39), former chairman and CEO of Philip Morris International
 Larry Zicklin (1957), businessman
 Michael Grimm (BBA, '91), former U.S. Representative

See also
List of United States business school rankings
List of business schools in the United States
Weissman School of Arts and Sciences
Marxe School of Public and International Affairs

References

External links

Sustainable Business Major at Zicklin School of Business
Finance and Economics Society - Bernard M. Baruch College

Baruch College
Business schools in New York (state)
Educational institutions established in 1919
1919 establishments in New York City